{{DISPLAYTITLE:Omega1 Aquarii}}

Omega1 Aquarii, Latinized from ω1 Aquarii, is the Bayer designation for a single star in the equatorial constellation of Aquarius. With an apparent visual magnitude of 4.96, this star is faintly visible to the naked eye from the suburbs.

The stellar classification of this star is A7 IV, matching a subgiant star. It is spinning rapidly with a projected rotational velocity of 105 km/s. The star is about 600 million years old and is radiating 15 times the Sun's luminosity. It has 1.9 times the mass of the Sun and 2.4 times the Sun's radius.

References

External links
 Image Omega1 Aquarii

A-type subgiants
Aquarius (constellation)
Aquarii, Omega1
BD-15 6471
Aquarii, 102
222345
116758
8968